The Valvifera are marine isopod crustaceans. Valviferans are distinguished, however, by the flat, valve-like uropods which hinge laterally and fold inward beneath the rear part of their bodies, covering the pleopods. Some species are omnivorous, and serve as effective scavengers in the economy of the sea.

Families
Twelve families are recognised:
Antarcturidae Poore, 2001 (17 genera)
Arcturidae Dana, 1849 (14 genera)
Arcturididae Poore, 2001 (one genus)
Austrarcturellidae Poore & Bardsley, 1992 (five genera)
Chaetiliidae Dana, 1849 (13 genera)
Holidoteidae Wägele, 1989 (four genera)
Holognathidae Thomson, 1904 (five genera)
Idoteidae Samouelle, 1819 (24 genera)
Pseudidotheidae Ohlin, 1901 (one genus)
Rectarcturidae Poore, 2001 (four genera)
Thermoarcturidae Poore, 2015 (three genera)
Xenarcturidae Sheppard, 1957 (one genus)

References

Isopoda
 
Arthropod suborders
Taxa named by Georg Ossian Sars